Augusta County Public Schools is the organization that operates the public school system in Augusta County, Virginia.  The school board is elected, and the current superintendent is Dr. Eric Bond.

Schools

Elementary 
 Churchville Elementary School 
 Edward G. Clymore Elementary School
 Craigsville Elementary School 
 Hugh K. Cassell Elementary School 
 North River Elementary School 
 Riverheads Elementary School 
 Guy K. Stump Elementary School 
 Stuarts Draft Elementary School 
 Wilson Elementary School

Middle 
 Beverley Manor Middle School 
 S. Gordon Stewart Middle School 
 Stuarts Draft Middle School 
 Wilson Middle School

High 
 Buffalo Gap High School 
 Mascot: Bison
 Fort Defiance High School 
 Mascot: Indians
 Riverheads High School 
 Mascot: Gladiators
 Stuarts Draft High School 
 Mascot: Cougars
 Wilson Memorial High School 
 Mascot: Hornets

Other 
 Shenandoah Valley Governor's School 
 Valley Vocational Technical Center

See also 
 List of school divisions in Virginia

External links 
 Augusta County Public Schools

School divisions in Virginia
Education in Augusta County, Virginia